Transparent Radiation is an EP by the British alternative rock band Spacemen 3. It was released in July 1987 as a 12" vinyl record. The title track is a cover version of a Red Krayola song from their debut album The Parable of Arable Land. The record plays at 33⅓ RPM.

Track listing
12" (GLAEP108)

Personnel

Spacemen 3
Sonic Boom – vocals, guitar, producer
J. Spaceman – guitar, vocals, organ, producer
Bassman – bass
Rosco – drums

Additional personnel
Owen John – violin
Graham Walker – engineer

References

1987 EPs
Spacemen 3 albums
Glass Records EPs
Fire Records (UK) EPs